Proathorybia is a genus of moths belonging to the family Tortricidae.

Species
Proathorybia athorybia (Razowski, 1997)
Proathorybia chlidonias Razowski, 1999
Proathorybia meyi Razowski, 2001
Proathorybia minima (Walsingham, 1914)
Proathorybia unisignata Razowski & Pelz, 2003
Proathorybia zonalis Razowski & Becker, 2000

See also
List of Tortricidae genera

References

 , 2005, World Catalogue of Insects 5

External links
tortricidae.com

Euliini
Tortricidae genera